Qelelevu or Nggelelevu is a coral islet in Fiji, a member of the Ringgold Isles archipelago, which forms an outlier to the northern island of Vanua Levu.

Geography 
Qelelevu covers an area of 1.5 square kilometers.

Qelelevu lagoon lies 8 miles eastward of Thakau Vuthovutho reef. The lagoon has three main passes allowing boats to enter: Rendell, Deep and Brown. Qelelevu is one of the two only true atolls of Fiji, because it has an island and is not a mere coral reef.

Most of the island is covered in palm trees and bushes.

The small village of Nalutu is located on Qelelevu. Fishing is the only significant economic activity.

The atoll habitat of the island contributes to its national significance as outlined in Fiji's Biodiversity Strategy and Action Plan.

History 
Qelelevu may have been first inhabited by people from Futuna. Later in time, people from Laucala arrived and soon dominated the population. Qelelevu has been in the Laucala sphere of influence, as well as other islands like Naitauba, Namalata, Yacata and villages of Vutuna, Daliconi and Mavana on Vanua Balavu.

References

Islands of Fiji
Ringgold Isles
Preliminary Register of Sites of National Significance in Fiji